The following is the discography of Brazilian rock band Titãs.

Albums

References

External links
 Official Website 
 Official English Website (by Jack Endino) 
 Rádio Terra - Listen to Titãs online 
 

Titãs
Rock music group discographies
Discographies of Brazilian artists
Latin music discographies